Robert Borofsky is an American anthropologist who has written and edited many published works. Many of his works are still looked at today in many college anthropology curriculums. 

Robert Borofsky was a Professor of Anthropology at Hawaii Pacific University and is currently an editor for the California Series in Public Anthropology. Robert Borofsky is also the founder and director of the Center for a Public Anthropology. Borofsky, now a retired anthropology professor, still continues to write and edit many works.

Education 
Robert Borofsky specializes in Public Anthropology, and received his B.A at Union College, received his Master's at Brandeis University, and went to obtain his Ph. D at the University of Hawaii at Manoa.

Soon after Robert Borofsky began teaching Anthropology at Hawaii Pacific University and is now retired from teaching.

Career 
Robert Borofsky is an American anthropologist who has encouraged many anthropologists to look into jobs and roles in public anthropology. The term "Public Anthropology has also been said to have been coined by Robert Borofsky.   Public anthropology, according to Borofsky, is more than a label and is when anthropologists pursue problems in the public outside of the discipline. Robert Borofsky believes that through anthropological work, one of the main goals is to do right by others, instead of being so focused on getting ahead in academic work.    

Along with being an anthropology professor, Borofsky is also an author of many anthropological books such as "Making History", and has edited many other works. Some of the books he has written are "An Anthropology of Anthropology", "Making History" and "Yanomami: The Fierce Controversy and What We Can Learn From It", which is about the Yanomami blood controversy when blood samples were taken and withheld important information from the Yanomami people regarding their blood samples.  

Robert Borofsky took part in the Yanomami Blood Controversy in an effort to return blood samples that were kept to study from the Yanomami. He wrote about the Yanomami blood controversy and what anthropologists can learn from this event in one of his recent publications.

Publications 
 Making History: Pukapukan and Anthropological Constructions of Knowledge, (1990).
 Yanomami: The Fierce Controversy and What We Can Learn from It, (2004).
 An Anthropology of Anthropology: Is It Time to Shift Paradigms, (2019).

References

American anthropologists
Hawaii Pacific University people
Union College (New York) alumni
Brandeis University alumni
University of Hawaiʻi at Mānoa alumni
Living people
Year of birth missing (living people)
Place of birth missing (living people)